Eutorna inornata is a moth in the family Depressariidae. It was described by Alfred Philpott in 1927. It is endemic to New Zealand and has been observed in both the North and South Islands. The larvae of this moth are leaf minors of Selliera radicans.

Taxonomy 
This species was described by Alfred Philpott in 1927 using specimens collected by himself at Seaward Moss in Invercargill in January as well as specimens collected by Mr Heighway and Mr Lindsay at Bottle Lake and Waikuku in Canterbury in November and March. The male holotype specimen, collected by Philpott at Seaward Moss, is held at the New Zealand Arthropod Collection.

Description 

Philpott described the species as follows:

Distribution 
This species is endemic to New Zealand and has been observed in the North and South Islands.

Habitat 
This species can be found in coastal habitats but has also been observed in native forest habitats.

Host species 

The larvae of this moth are leaf miners of Selliera radicans, a plant that can be found in coastal to alpine habitats.

References

Moths described in 1927
Eutorna
Moths of New Zealand
Endemic fauna of New Zealand
Taxa named by Alfred Philpott
Endemic moths of New Zealand